The 70th annual Venice International Film Festival took place in Venice, Italy from 28 August to 7 September 2013. American film director William Friedkin was presented with a lifetime achievement award. Italian film director Bernardo Bertolucci was the President of the Jury. He was previously the President of the Jury at the 40th edition in 1983. Gravity, directed by Alfonso Cuarón, was the opening film of the festival. Italian actress Eva Riccobono hosted the opening and closing nights of the festival.

The Golden Lion was awarded to the Italian documentary film Sacro GRA. It was the first documentary film to win the award at the Venice Festival.

Jury
The following people were selected for the main competition jury:

Main competition (Venezia 70)
 Bernardo Bertolucci, Italian director (Jury President)
 Andrea Arnold, English director
 Renato Berta, Swiss-France director of photography
 Carrie Fisher, American actress, screenwriter and novelist
 Martina Gedeck, German actress
 Pablo Larraín, Chilean director
 Virginie Ledoyen, French actress
 Ryuichi Sakamoto, Japanese composer
 Jiang Wen, Chinese actor and director

Horizons (Orizzonti)
 Paul Schrader, American screenwriter, film director and critic (President)
 Catherine Corsini, French film director, screenwriter and actress
 Leonardo Di Costanzo, Italian director, screenwriter and cinematographer 
 Golshifteh Farahani, Iranian actress, musician and singer
 Frédéric Fonteyne, Belgian film director
 Kseniya Rappoport, Russian actress
 Amr Waked, Egyptian film, TV and stage actor

Opera Prima (Venice Award for a Debut Film)
 Haifaa Al Mansour, Saudi Arabian film director (President) 
 Amat Escalante, Mexican film director, producer and screenwriter
 Alexej German Jr., Soviet and Russian director and screenwriter
 Geoffrey Gilmore, director of Tribeca Film Festival
 Ariane Labed, Greek-born French actress
 Maria Sole Tognazzi, Italian film director

Official selection

In Competition
The following films were selected for the main competition:

Out of Competition
The following films were selected for the out of competition section:

Horizons
The following films were selected for the Horizons (Orizzonti) section:

Highlighted titles indicate the Orizzonti Awards for Best Feature Film and Best Short Film respectively.

Venice Classics
The following selection of restored classic films and documentaries on cinema were screened for this section:

Highlighted titles indicate the Venice Classics Awards for Best Restored Film and Best Documentary on Cinema respectively.

Biennale College - Cinema
The following films were screened for the "Biennale College - Cinema" section, a higher education training workshop for micro-budget feature films:

Final Cut in Venice
The following films were screened for the "Final Cut in Venice" section, a workshop to support the post-production of films from Africa:

Special Screenings
The following films were the Special Screenings of the Official Selection:
 Dietro le quinte di otto e 1/2 by Gideon Bachmann (Italy)
 Dai Nostri Inviati – La RAI racconta la mostra del cinema di Venezia 1980-1989 by Enrico Salvatori, Giuseppe Giannotti, Davide Savelli (Italy)

Venice 70 - Future Reloaded 
Under the project title Venice 70 - Future Reloaded, 70 top film directors were each invited to make a 60-90 second short film, as "both a collective tribute to the Festival (the first festival in the world to reach the milestone of 70 editions) and a reflection on the future of cinema".

Autonomous sections

Venice International Film Critics' Week
The following films were selected for the Critics' Week:

Venice Days
The following films were selected for the 10th edition of the Venice Days (Giornate degli Autori) section: Starting from this edition, Venice Days has created its own international award "for a film from the entire Official Selection".

Highlighted title indicates the official Venice Days Award winner.

Awards

Official selection
The following Official Awards were conferred at the 70th edition:

In Competition (Venezia 70)
 Golden Lion: Sacro GRA by Gianfranco Rosi
 Silver Lion for Best Director: Alexandros Avranas for Miss Violence
 Grand Jury Prize: Stray Dogs by Tsai Ming-liang
 Volpi Cup for Best Actor: Themis Panou for Miss Violence
 Volpi Cup for Best Actress: Elena Cotta for Via Castellana Bandiera
 Marcello Mastroianni Award: Tye Sheridan for Joe
 Award for Best Screenplay: Steve Coogan and Jeff Pope for Philomena
 Special Jury Prize: The Police Officer's Wife by Philip Gröning

Horizons (Orizzonti) 
 Best Film: Eastern Boys by Robin Campillo
 Best Director: Uberto Pasolini for Still Life
 Special Jury Prize: Ruin by Amiel Courtin-Wilson & Michael Cody
 Special Award for Innovative Content: Shahram Mokri for Fish & Cat (Mahi Va Gorbeh)
 Horizons Award for Best Short Film: Kush by Shubhashish Bhutiani

Venice Classics Awards
 Best Restored Film: Property Is No Longer a Theft (La proprietà non è più un furto) by Elio Petri
 Best Documentary on Cinema: Double Play: James Benning and Richard Linklater by Gabe Klinger

Special Awards
 Golden Lion For Lifetime Achievement: William Friedkin
 Persol Tribute to Visionary Talent Award: Andrzej Wajda
 Jaeger-LeCoultre Glory to the Filmmaker Award: Ettore Scola
 L’Oréal Paris per il Cinema Award: Eugenia Costantini

Autonomous sections
The following official and collateral awards were conferred to films of the autonomous sections:

Venice International Film Critics' Week
 Lion of the Future
Luigi De Laurentiis Venice Award For A Debut Film: White Shadow by Noaz Deshe
 FIPRESCI Awards - Best Film (Critics' Week): The Reunion (Återträffen) by Anna Odell
 Arca CinemaGiovani Award - Best Italian film: The Art of Happiness (L’arte della felicità) by Alessandro Rak
 FEDIC Award: Zoran, My Nephew the Idiot (Zoran, il mio nipote scemo) by Matteo Oleotto
Special mention: The Art of Happiness by Alessandro Rak
 Fedeora Awards:
Best Film: Class Enemy by Rok Bicek
Award for Best Cinematography: Inti Briones for The Quispe Girls (Las niñas Quispe) by Sebastián Sepúlveda
Special mention: Giuseppe Battiston for his role in Zoran, il mio nipote scemo
Special mention: Anna Odell for complete author’s work in the film The Reunion
 "RaroVideo" Audience Award: Zoran, My Nephew the Idiot by Matteo Oleotto
 Schermi di Qualità Award: Zoran, My Nephew the Idiot by Matteo Oleotto

Venice Days (Giornati degli Autori)
 Venice Days Award: Kill Your Darlings by John Krokidas
 Label Europa Cinemas Award: The Good Life (La belle vie) by Jean Denizot
 Open Award: Serena Nono for directing Venezia salva
 Lina Mangiacapre Award - Special mention: Traitors by Sean Gullette
 Fedeora Awards:
Best Film: Bethlehem by Yuval Adler
Best director of a debut film: Milko Lazarov for Alienation
Special mention: The Good Life (La belle vie) by Jean Denizot
 Europa Cinemas Label Award: The Good Life (La belle vie) by Jean Denizot
Special mention: Alienation by Milko Lazarov

Other collateral awards
The following collateral awards were conferred to films of the official selection:
 FIPRESCI Awards - Best Film (Main competition): Tom at the Farm by Xavier Dolan
 SIGNIS Award: Philomena by Stephen Frears
Special mention: Ana Arabia by Amos Gitai
 Francesco Pasinetti (SNGCI) Award: 
Best Film: Still Life by Uberto Pasolini (Horizons)
Best Actors: Elena Cotta, Alba Rohrwacher, Antonio Albanese
Special mention: Maria Rosaria Omaggio for her role in Walesa. Man of Hope
Special mention: The Third Half (Il terzo tempo) by Enrico Maria Artale (Horizons)
 Leoncino d'Oro Agiscuola Award: Sacro GRA by Gianfranco RosiCinema for UNICEF mention: Philomena by Stephen Frears
 Brian Award: Philomena by Stephen Frears
 Queer Lion Award: Philomena by Stephen Frears
 Arca CinemaGiovani Award - Venezia 70: Miss Violence by Alexandros Avranas
 Christopher D. Smithers Foundation Award: Joe by David Gordon Green
 CICT - UNESCO "Enrico Fulchignoni" Award: At Berkeley by Frederick Wiseman (Out of competition)
 CICAE - Cinema d’Arte e d’Essai Award: Still Life by Uberto Pasolini (Horizons)
 Fedeora Award for Best Euro-Mediterranean film: Miss Violence by Alexandros Avranas
 Fondazione Mimmo Rotella Award: L'intrepido by Gianni Amelio
 Future Film Festival Digital Award: Gravity by Alfonso Cuarón (Out of competition)
Special mention: The Zero Theorem by Terry Gilliam
 P. Nazareno Taddei Award: Philomena by Stephen Frears
 Lanterna Magica (CGS) Award: L'intrepido by Gianni Amelio
 Lina Mangiacapre Award: Via Castellana Bandiera by Emma Dante
Special mention: Femen’s activists of Ukraine Is Not a Brothel by Kitty Green (Out of competition)
 Golden Mouse: Philomena by Stephen Frears
Special mention: Stray Dogs (Jiaoyou) by Tsai Ming-liang
 Silvier Mouse: At Berkeley by Frederick Wiseman (Out of competition)
Special mention: Home from Home (Die andere heimat – Cronik einer sehnsucht) by Edgar Reitz (Out of competition)
 UK-ITALY Creative Industries Award – Best Innovative Budget:The Third Half by Enrico Maria Artale (Horizons)Medeas by Andrea Pallaoro (Horizons)Kush by Shubhashish Bhutiani (Horizons)
 Interfilm Award for Promoting Interreligious Dialogue: Philomena by Stephen Frears
 Gillo Pontecorvo Award: Con il fiato sospeso by Costanza Quatriglio (Out of competition)
 Green Drop Award: Ana Arabia by Amos Gitai
 Young Jury Members of the Vittorio Veneto Film Festival: Philomena by Stephen Frears
Special mention for a debut film: Via Castellana Bandiera by Emma Dante
 "Civitas Vitae prossima" Award: Still Life by Uberto Pasolini
 Soundtrack Stars Award*
Best Soundtrack Award: Via Castellana Bandiera'' by Emma Dante
Special mention for Best Contemporary Actor: Ryuchi Sakamoto (Venezia 70 Jury member)
 Ambiente WWF Award: Amazonia by Thierry Ragobert (Out of competition)
 Bianchi Award: Enzo d’Aló

References

External links

Venice Film Festival 2013 Awards on IMDb

Venice Film Festival
Venice Film Festival
Venice Film Festival
Venice Film Festival
Film
August 2013 events in Italy
September 2013 events in Italy